Den nye lægen is a 1943 Norwegian drama film directed by Rasmus Breistein, starring Jon Lennart Mjøen. The film is based on a play by Bjarne Viggo Holbæk-Hansen.

Cast
 Eva Lunde as Rigmor, hans datter
 Erna Schøyen as Klara, hans kone
 Jon Lennart Mjøen as Kåre Bugge, doktor
 Carl Struve as Øyvind, Ulrichs yngre bror
 Folkman Schaanning as Pastor Reimers
 Tryggve Larssen as Pallsen, doktor
 Ellen Isefiær as Fru Hoffmann
 Thorleif Reiss as Mørch, ingeniør
 Einar Vaage as Ordføreren
 Jorunn Groth as Victoria, Mørchs datter
 Erling Hanson as Hoffmann, direktør
 Kirsten Bødtker as Sonja Hoffmann
 Sofie Bernhoft as Madam Anders, en klok kone
 Oscar Amundsen as Fylkesmannen
 Haakon Arnold as Antonsen
 Ester Tellander as Anna Antonsen
 Oscar Egede-Nissen as Jentoft
 Thorleif Mikkelsen as Knatten
 Arthur Barking as the master builder

External links
 
 

1943 films
1943 drama films
Films directed by Rasmus Breistein
Norwegian drama films
Norwegian black-and-white films
1940s Norwegian-language films